The 12065 / 12066 Ajmer–Delhi Sarai Rohilla Jan Shatabdi Express is a Superfast Express train of the Jan Shatabdi category belonging to Indian Railways - North Western Railway zone that runs between  and  in India.

It operates as train number 12065 from Ajmer Junction to Delhi Sarai Rohilla and as train number 12066 in the reverse direction, serving the states of Delhi, Haryana & Rajasthan.

This train formerly ran as a Ajmer–Hazrat Nizamuddin Duronto Express but due to poor demand was converted to a Jan Shatabdi Express.

Coaches

The 12065 / 12066 Ajmer–Delhi Sarai Rohilla Jan Shatabdi Express has 1 AC car, 12 Second Class seating & 2 power cars. It does not carry a pantry car.

As is customary with most train services in India, coach composition may be amended at the discretion of Indian Railways depending on demand.

Service

As the average speed of the train is above , as per Indian Railways rules, its fare includes a Superfast surcharge.

Routeing

Traction

As the entire route is now fully electrified, a Ghaziabad-based WAP-5 / WAP-7 electric locomotive powers the train for its entire journey.

Timings

 12065 Ajmer–Delhi Sarai Rohilla Jan Shatabdi Express leaves Ajmer Junction every Monday, Tuesday, Wednesday, Friday & Saturday at 05:40 hrs IST and reaches Delhi Sarai Rohilla at 11:35 hrs IST the same day.
 12066 Delhi Sarai Rohilla–Ajmer Jan Shatabdi Express leaves Delhi Sarai Rohilla every Monday, Tuesday, Wednesday, Friday & Saturday at 16:20 hrs IST and reaches Ajmer Junction at 22:25 hrs IST the same day.

References 

 https://web.archive.org/web/20160126012037/http://www.indianrail.gov.in/jan_shatabdi.html
 http://articles.economictimes.indiatimes.com/2013-11-04/news/43658782_1_stoppages-train-occupancy
 http://www.nr.indianrailways.gov.in/view_detail.jsp?lang=0&dcd=3239&id=0,4,268
 https://www.youtube.com/watch?v=DMklOWdVKGQ
 https://www.flickr.com/photos/55998266@N08/11337567923/
 https://web.archive.org/web/20131201203814/http://rajasthanpatrika.patrika.com/news/ajmer-nizamuddin-jan-shatabdi/1107475.html
 http://www.dailypioneer.com/todays-newspaper/5-pairs-of-duranto-get-new-names-for-want-of-travellers.html

External links

Transport in Ajmer
Transport in Delhi
Rail transport in Delhi
Rail transport in Haryana
Rail transport in Rajasthan
Jan Shatabdi Express trains
Railway services introduced in 2013